Stuart Wurtzel (born August 9, 1940) is an American art director. He was nominated for an Academy Award in the category Best Art Direction for the film Hannah and Her Sisters.

Selected filmography
 Hannah and Her Sisters (1986)

References

External links

1940 births
Living people
American art directors
Artists from Newark, New Jersey
Emmy Award winners